Litvan may refer to:
György Litván (1929-2006), Hungarian historian and politician
Litvan, Iran, a village in Golestan Province, Iran